Meade Island  is an uninhabited sand island located about 200 metres from Dirk Hartog Island in the Shark Bay World Heritage Site in Western Australia, and joined to that island at low tide. It has an area of about 800 square metres (0.2 acre), and an elevation of two metres (7 ft).

The island's vegetation is a closed heath, of which the dominant plant species are Nitraria billardierei (Nitre Bush), Scaevola  crassifolia (Thick-leaved Fan-flower) and Spinifex longifolius (Beach Spinifex). Other plant species include Exocarpos aphyllus (Leafless Ballart), Rhagodia preissii subsp. obovata, Salsola  tragus (Prickly Saltwort), Sonchus oleraceus (Common Sow-thistle), and a species of Pelargonium. Eight species of seabird roost on the island.

References

See also
 List of islands of Western Australia

Islands of Shark Bay
Uninhabited islands of Australia